Birdforth is a village and civil parish in the Hambleton district of North Yorkshire, England.  According to the 2001 census it had a population of 13. The population remained less than 100 at the 2011 Census. Details are included in the civil parish of Long Marston, North Yorkshire.  The village is on the A19 road, about six miles south of Thirsk.

History
Birdforth was also the name of one of the wapentakes, or subdivisions, of the North Riding of Yorkshire, which covered the area around the village. A school was built in 1875, but closed in 1961.

Governance
The village lies within the Thirsk and Malton UK Parliament constituency. It is also within the Easingwold electoral division of North Yorkshire County Council and the Helperby ward of Hambleton District Council.

Geography
The nearest settlements to the village are Hutton Sessay  to the north-west; Carlton Husthwaite  to the north-east and Thormanby  to the south. Birdforth Beck, which flows at the south end of the village, is part of the tributary system of the River Swale.

The 1881 UK Census recorded the population as 42.

Religion

St Mary's Church, Birdforth is a grade II listed Norman church; it was partly rebuilt in 1585, but is no longer in use.

References

Villages in North Yorkshire
Civil parishes in North Yorkshire